The third season of Love Island Australia premiered on the Nine Network and 9Now on Monday, 11 October 2021 presented by Sophie Monk and narrated by Stephen Mullan.

Format
Love Island involves a group of contestants, referred to as Islanders (in the show) living in isolation from the outside world in a villa in Byron Bay, constantly under video surveillance. To survive in the villa the Islanders must be coupled up with another Islander, whether it be for love, friendship or money, as the overall winning couple receives $50,000. On the first day, the Islanders couple up for the first time based on first impressions, but over the duration of the series, they are forced to "re-couple" where they can choose to remain in their current couple or swap and change.

Any Islander who remains single after the coupling is eliminated and dumped from the island. Islanders can also be eliminated via public vote, as during the series the public vote through the Love Island app available on smartphones for their favourite islanders (as singles or couples), or who they think is the most compatible. Those with the fewest votes risk being eliminated. Occasionally, Islanders themselves will vote off each other off the island. During the final week, the public vote for which couple they want to win the series and therefore take home $50,000. The winners can pick between share the money ($25,000 each) or take it all depending on an envelope they open as seen in previous seasons.

Islanders
The first Islanders were announced on the socials, one week before the premiere episode.

Coupling and elimination history

 : Lexy arrived after the first coupling, and was told she would be able to steal a boy for herself on Day 3. Lexy chose to couple up with Ryan, leaving Ari single. All other Day 1 couples remained the same.
: After the re-coupling, Courtney was left single. Based on Australia's vote Aaron, Chris and Taku had the power to dump either Lexy or Rachael. They chose Rachael to dump.
: As new arrivals, Nicolas and Zoe were able steal a partner for themselves on Day 15. Nicolas chose Courtney, and Zoe chose Chris. All other couples from Day 10's recoupling remained set.
: Aaron declared that he was leaving the show. The next day he decided to stay.

Ratings

References

2021 Australian television seasons
Television shows filmed in Australia
Television shows set in New South Wales